Martin Bentzen Veng Mikkelsen (born 29 April 1986) is a Danish football coach and former professional footballer who played as a midfielder. He is currently manager of Aarhus Fremad's reserve team.

Playing career
Mikkelsen made his professional debut as part of AGF on 25 July 2004 in a 2–2 away draw against FC Nordsjælland, coming on as an 81st-minute substitute for Jeffrey Aubynn. He would later play for FC Fredericia and Hobro IK.

Coaching career
On 11 August 2019, Mikkelsen returned to FC Fredericia. Two weeks later, he was also hired as a youth consultant at Danish 2nd Division club VSK Aarhus.

He left Fredericia in June 2020, and signed with Aarhus Fremad in the Danish 2nd Division, where he would become a player-assistant to head coach Morten Dahm Kjærgaard. He retired as a player in July 2021 to focus full-time on his role as assistant coach of Aarhus Fremad. On 14 June 2022 Mikkelsen confirmed, that he accepted an offer to become the manager of Aarhus Fremad's reserve team, which was playing in the Denmark Series.

Career statistics

References

External links
National team profile
Career statistics at Danmarks Radio

1986 births
Living people
Danish men's footballers
Aarhus Gymnastikforening players
FC Fredericia players
Hobro IK players
Aarhus Fremad players
Danish Superliga players
Danish 1st Division players
Danish 2nd Division players
Association football midfielders
Association football defenders
VSK Aarhus players
Denmark youth international footballers
Footballers from Aarhus
Danish football managers